Flirting with Disaster is a 2015 jazz album by Lorraine Feather. It earned Feather a Grammy Award nomination for Best Jazz Vocal Album.

References 

2015 albums
Jazz albums by American artists